Stanley James Carroll Beck (21 February 1929 – 6 August 1973) was an English actor who played the role of Private Walker, a cockney spiv, in the BBC sitcom Dad's Army from the show's beginning in 1968 until his sudden death in 1973.

Early life
Beck was born on 21 February 1929 in Islington, North London, and attended Popham Road Primary School. His childhood was hard, with his father frequently unemployed and his mother making artificial flowers to provide a small income.

After attending Saint Martin's School of Art and doing his national service as a physical training instructor in the British Army, Beck became an actor. Prior to his broadcast roles he spent several seasons with the Unicorn Players  based in Paignton, Devon.

His early broadcast roles included Charlie Bell in an episode of Dr Finlay's Casebook (Series 1 episode 4, "Conduct Unbecoming", 1962), and Shylock in The Merchant of Venice in 1963, for which he gained positive reviews. He concentrated on television and was cast as a policeman in a 1965 episode of Coronation Street in a storyline concerning the collapse of a house and in a 1967 episode in a storyline concerning a train crash. He also appeared, uncredited, as a policeman in Gideon's Way (1965), and was often seen in TV drama, with one-off roles in series such as The Troubleshooters (1965, 1967, 1970) and the BBC's Sherlock Holmes with Peter Cushing in the lead ("The Blue Carbuncle", 1968).

In 1968, he was offered the role of Private Walker in Dad's Army, originally written by Jimmy Perry for himself. Perry approved of the casting of Beck: "He had the right mix of cheekiness and charm. He gave the role a bit of oomph." While successful in the role, Beck yearned for the challenge of other roles.

Always in demand, he continued to work on TV programmes including A Family at War (1970) and Romany Jones (1972–73), in which he played the lead character of Bert Jones. He also recorded a pilot for an uncommissioned series called Bunclarke With an E (1973), which was to be based on scripts originally written for Hancock's Half Hour and in which Arthur Lowe was also to appear.

Death
By 1973, Beck had recorded five series of Dad's Army and had nearly finished working on the sixth, besides working on the radio series of the show. Location filming for series six was completed when Beck suddenly fell ill while opening a school fête in aid of Guide Dogs for the Blind. He returned home and within an hour was taken to Queen Mary's Hospital, Roehampton suffering from pancreatitis. He died three weeks later, due to a combination of heart failure, renal failure and pancreatitis, aged 44, and was cremated at Putney Vale Cemetery, where a tree was planted in his memory, with a marker bearing his name.

The last time Beck's Dad's Army co-stars saw him alive was on Friday 13 July 1973 at the Playhouse Theatre in London where he recorded two radio episodes of Dad's Army (which ran alongside the TV series). The following afternoon Beck suddenly became ill. 

His death was a great shock to his fellow cast members, as well as to Jimmy Perry and David Croft. Perry has said that heavy drinking was common in show business at the time, and that he paid little attention to Beck's habit until "I saw Jimmy’s legs and they were purple. It was the last episode he appeared in before he died."

In the sixth series, during the episode "Things that Go Bump in the Night", Walker is present only in the location scenes in the second half of the episode, as these were filmed weeks earlier than the studio scenes. In one of the videotaped sequences filmed after Beck's death, the platoon is aboard Corporal Jones's van when Captain Mainwaring tells Sergeant Wilson to "take Private Walker's name". Wilson writes the name "Walker" in the condensation on the window. 

In the following episode, "The Recruit" (the series 6 finale), Mainwaring reads a note written by Walker apologising for his absence, as he has gone "up the Smoke" (to London) to conduct one of his deals. This was the last time the character was mentioned. In the radio adaptations of Dad's Army, Graham Stark stood in until Larry Martyn portrayed Walker in subsequent shows. John Bardon played Walker in the stage production in 1976.

Filmography

Film

Television

Radio

References

Further reading

External links 

 James Beck BFI

1929 births
1973 deaths
Male actors from London
Alumni of Saint Martin's School of Art
Burials at Putney Vale Cemetery
Deaths from pancreatitis
British male comedy actors
English male television actors
English male film actors
English male stage actors
People from Islington (district)
20th-century English male actors
British Army soldiers
20th-century British Army personnel
Military personnel from London